Swell Music + Sound is a music, sound design, and audio post-production house based in Los Angeles and San Francisco, California. They provide music and sound for film, TV, and multimedia. Swell was founded by lead composer/mixer Elad Marish. Swell's work can be found on nationwide spots (AT&T, Ubisoft, Pepsi, MTV, BET) and on music videos for artists such as Beyonce, Pitbull, Nicki Minaj, Drake, and Lil Wayne.

Commercial/Promo 

 Reebok "Be Ventilated feat. Kendrick Lamar" - Sound Design, Mix
 Hasbro "Twister" - Mix
 Audi "Autonomous Office Chair" - Sound Design, Mix
 Audi "A6 Web Campaign 2015" - Sound Design, Mix
 Juniper "Product Drops" - Sound Design
 Autodesk "Showreel 2015" - Original Music, Sound Design
 Google "I/O Conference Promo" - Mix
 SF Travel "Holidays" - Mix
 Sonic Brand - Original Music, Mix
 Levi's "Live In Levi's Project Film" - Mix
 Toyota "Prius Testimonials" - Original Music, Mix
 Google "Find Your People Maganlal Dresswalla" - Original Music
 Jaguar "R Series" - Original Music
 PayPal Cannes Submission "Poemgrammes" - Original Music, Sound Design, Mix
 YouTube "Brandlift" - Original Music, Sound Design
 Google "Swirl" - Original Music
 Toyota "Beyonce - I Decide" - Sound Design
 SoundHawk Product Launch - Original Music, Sound Design, Mix
 CA Technologies "DevOps" - Original Music, Sound Design, Mix
 Rambus "Capture. Secure. Move." - Original Music, Sound Design, Mix
 Cricut Product Launch - Original Music
 Miami Heat "2014" - Sound Design
 College Inn "Social Kitchen" - Original Music, Mix
 WFTDA "Rollergirl" - Sound Design
 Boiron "Oscillo" - Music, VO, Mix
 NBA "Delivery Service" - Original Music
 Converse "Exploratory" - Music, Sound Design, Mix
 Domino's "Pizza Punk" - Original Music, Sound Design
 CISCO "Connect to the Future" - Sound Design and Mix
 Diane Von Furstenberg Google Hangout - Music Supervision
 Malibu Red Logo Design - Sonic Branding
 Old Navy "$6 Sandals" - Music, Sound Design, Mix
 Symantec "Mobile" - Original Music
 Adobe Photoshop "Milestones" – Audio Conform
 Duracell PowerMat "Never Be Powerless" - Original Music, Sound Design
 Jam Bluetooth Speakers - Original Music, Sound Design
 Google Plus "Go Gators" - Original Music, Sound Design
 Symantec "Insight" - Original Music, Sound Design
 Xbox Dance Central 2 - "DANCE*CAM App Promo" - Original Music
 Men's Wearhouse - "Me Gifting" - Original Music, Mix
 T-Mobile MyTouch 4G "Out Of Box Experience" - Original Music, Mix
 Reebok "Rhythm Of Lite" - Sound Design, Mix
 Adobe Touch Apps - Sonic Branding
 All "Evolution" - Original Music, Mix
 AT&T – "Take Your TV" – Original Music, Mix
 Push Pops "Hero" – Original Music
 "Miami Heat" promo – Sound Design
 Corn Pops "Toothasaurus" – Sound Design, Mix
 Palmetto Health "Father/Son Connections” and "Mother/Daughter Connections” – Original Music, Sound Design, Mix
 Palmetto Health "Donut", "Giant Babies", and "Crawling Baby" – Sound Design, Mix
 DirecTV "Tommy Boy" – Licensed Track
 Coca-Cola "Beijing Olympics" – Audio Conform
 Lucido “Additional” – Sound Design
 The Jonas Brothers Commercials “Mandy” – Mix
 Verizon “Call Dropped” – Sound Design, Mix
 Pepsi "Wisin y Yandel" – Sound Design, Mix
 Nike ”Beautiful Monster” – Sound Design, Mix
 Sony BMG Music Entertainment “Platinum MusicPass” – Sound Design, Mix
 Rihanna ”Good Girl Gone Bad – Reloaded” – Sound Design, Mix
 Duffy ”Rockferry” Promo – Mix
 Honda "Celebrate" – Sound Design, Mix
 VH1 Networks "But Can They Sing?" promo – Sound Design, Mix
 Soccer America/”World Cup 2006” – Sound Design, Mix

Film/TV + Longform 

 Metal Gear Solid V:The Phantom Pain Trailer - Sound Design
 "LA Shrinks" Theme song
 Millionaire Matchmaker - Original Music
 Babyface “Grown and Sexy” – Sound Design, Mix
 The Chefsters – Theme song
 Common “Testify” – Sound Dseign, Mix
 Duran Duran – “Falling Down” – Sound Design,Mix
 The Killers “Cuando Eran Joven” – Sound Design, Mix, Re-mixing
 Ubi Soft “Enchanted Arms” – Dialog Engineer
 Malcolm McLaren "8 Bit Me" and “Hotel Fever – Music for the W. Hotel” – Editing, Mastering
 Mint Condition “Mint Condition Live/BET Special” – Sound Design, 5.1 Mix

Music video

 Action Bronson feat. Chance The Rapper "Baby Blue" - Sound Design, Mix
 Beyonce “Pretty Hurts” Original Music, Sound Design
 Ariat "Boot Loose" - Music Supervision
 Sammy Adams "LA Story" - Sound Design
 A$AP Rocky ft Skrillex "Wild for the Nite" - Sound Design
 Alicia Keys "Fire We Make" - Sound Design
 DJ Khaled "FedUp" - Score, Sound Design
 Lupe Fiasco "Bitch Bad" - Score
 LMFAO "Champagne Showers" - Sound Design
 Lil Wayne "How To Love" - Sound Design, Mix
 Nicki Minaj -- "Moment 4 Life" - Score and Sound Design
 Soulja Boy -- "Speakers Going Hammer" - Score and Sound Design
 Birdman -- "FireFlame" - Score
 TI feat. Justin Timberlake -- "Dead and Gone" - Score
 Young Jeezy "Vacation" – Sound Design, Mix
 Lil Wayne "Got Money" – Sound Design, Mix
 Akon "So Paid" – Sound Design, Mix
 Ludacris "Runaway Love" -– Original Composition, Intro
 Korn “Hold On” – Sound Design, Mix
 Jay-Z “Lost Ones” – Sound Design, Mix
 Godsmack “Good Times Bad Times” – Sound Design, Mix
 Ashanti “Still On It” – Sound Design, Mix
 Birdman f/ Rick Ross, Young Jeezy “100 Million Dollars” – Composition, Sound Design, Mix
 System of a Down “BYOB” – Sound Design, Mix
 The Killers “When You Were Young” – Sound Design, Composition, Mix
 Sage Francis “Escape Artist” – Sound Design, Mix
 Avant “You Know What” – Sound Design, Mix
 Common “Testify” – Sound Design, Mix
 Mack 10 “Like This” – Sound Design, Mix
 Field Mob “Friday Night” – Sound Design, Mix
 Sean Kingston "Take You There" – Original Music, Intro
 Dem Franchize Boyz w/ Jermaine Dupri “I Think They Like Me” – Sound Design, Mix
 Ray Cash "Sex Appeal" – Sound Design, Mix
 Chris Brown “Yo” – Sound Design, Mix
 50 Cent “Just A Little Bit” – Original Music, Sound Design, Mix
 DMX “Give Em’ What They Want” – Sound Design, Mix

Grammy nominations – Best Music Video/Short Form

 Omarion f/ Timbaland “Ice Box” – Sound Design, Mix
 Young Jeezy “Bury Me A G” – Sound Design, Mix
 Paris Hilton “Nothing In This World” – Sound Design, Mix
 Nelly Furtado “ManEater” – Sound Design, Composition, Mix
 Bubba Sparxxx “Ms. New Booty” – Sound Design, Mix
 Eminem “When I’m Gone” – Sound Design, Mix
 Ice Cube “Chrome & Paint” – Sound Design, Mix
 Akon “Pot Of Gold” – Sound Design, Composition, Mix
 50 Cent “Hustla’s Ambition” – Composition, Sound Design, Mix
 Cassidy “I’m A Hustla” – Sound Design, Sound Editing, Mix
 Shanice “Take Care of U” – Sound Design, Mix
 Ne-Yo “So Sick” – Sound Design, Mix
 Dogg Pound Gangsta Crew “Real Soon”– Sound Design, Mix
 Lil Flip “What It Do” – Sound Design, Mix
 Nore “I’m a G” – Sound Design, Mix
 Snoop Dogg “Ups and  Downs” – Sound Design, Mix
 Leona Lewis “Bleeding Love” – Sound Design, Mix
 Duran Duran “Falling Down” – Composition, Sound Design, Mix
 Santana f/ Chad Kroeger “Into The Night” – Sound Design, Mix
 Fergie “Big Girls Don’t Cry” – Sound Design, Mix

Albums/Productions 

 Alicia Keys - Songs in A Minor - 10th Anniversary Edition, "A Harlem Love Story" - Mix, Sound Design, Music Edit
 Dandelion Man, "Stars Over Shootland", Composition, Production
 Notorious BIG Tribute, Vitamin Records - Mix
 Hoopmixes Vol 1&2, Music by Elad - Original Music
 Uberbabe Vol 1. "Same as it Ever Was", Composition, with DJ Cody Lee

Trailers 

 Akon Album "So Paid" Theatrical Trailer – Score, Sound Design, Mix
 "Even Money" Trailer – Licensed Track
 "The Hoax" Teaser – Original Music

References

External links 
 Swell Music website

Music companies of the United States